Trams make an important contribution to public transport in the city of Zürich in Switzerland. The tram network serves most city neighbourhoods, and is the backbone of public transport within the city, albeit supplemented by the inner sections of the Zürich S-Bahn, along with urban trolleybus and bus routes as well as two funicular railways and one rack railway. The trams and other city transport modes operate within a fare regime provided by the cantonal public transport authority Zürcher Verkehrsverbund (ZVV), which also covers regional rail and bus services.

The city's trams are operated by the Verkehrsbetriebe Zürich (VBZ), which also manages the tramway infrastructure within the city, but the city's tram tracks are also used by two other operations. The Glattalbahn tram services to the Glattal area to the north of the city interwork with the city tram services and are also operated by the VBZ, although in this case it does so as a sub-contractor to the Verkehrsbetriebe Glattal (VBG). Trains of the independent Forchbahn (FB) light railway also use the city's tram lines to reach their city centre terminus.

Trams have been a consistent part of Zürich's streetscape since the 1880s, when the first horse tram ran. Electrified from the 1890s, they have seen off challenges including proposals to replace them by trolleybuses and by a metro or U-Bahn. With a relatively static city network from the 1930s to the late 1970s, the city's trams have been expanding again since then. Recent expansions have taken the network into the suburbs beyond the city boundary, covering areas it retreated from in the first part of the 20th century. Further extensions have been approved, both to the city tram network itself, and by the introduction of a new light rail system in the Limmat Valley that will interwork with the city trams.

History

Beginnings

Various projects to introduce trams to Zürich were proposed from the 1860s onwards. It was not until 1882, however, that the first tram operated in the city.

The EStZ only survived for two years before it was taken over by the City of Zürich, who renamed it the Städtische Strassenbahn Zürich (StStZ). The following year, the horse trams of the ZStG were acquired.

Further tramway companies were founded, some operating entirely within the city, some connecting the city with its nearer suburbs, and some running in rural areas entirely beyond the city, but still linked by connections with other lines to the city. Like the EStZ, all these lines were electrified and were built to the metre gauge. The StStZ gradually took over those companies that had significant city operations, usually closing any cross-boundary lines, whilst leaving those lines entirely beyond the city to their own devices.

Many companies

The many companies that operated trams in and around Zürich are summarised in the table below. Names of companies whose lines were entirely outside the current city boundaries are shown in italic type, and those which still operate tram or other light rail services are shown in bold type.

Heyday of the StStZ

By the mid-1930s, the StStZ had acquired all the companies that had operated tramways within the city boundaries, with the single exception of the Dolderbahn, which had closed its short tramway in 1930. The standard gauge horse tram lines had all been converted to metre gauge and electrified. The StStZ had also built many tram extensions, resulting in a dense network of tramlines serving most city neighbourhoods.

However, in 1927, the StStZ had introduced its first motor bus route, and this was to be followed in 1939 by the first of the city's trolleybus routes. Initially these modes complemented the trams, but at various times they have threatened to replace parts of the tram system, and sometimes succeeded in doing so.

Despite Switzerland's neutrality, the economic effects of the second world war slowed down the program, but by 1953 the VBZ, as the StStZ had become in 1950, had taken delivery of 177 such trams.

Lines closed

While the tram network within the city of Zürich has seen relatively few line closures, the same cannot be said for the lines beyond the city. The StStZ routinely closed any out-of-city lines belonging to the companies it took over. In other cases, private sector operated lines succumbed without StStZ involvement. Out of town closures included:

 The Schlieren to Dietikon and Schlieren to Weinigen lines of the LSB company, closed in 1928 and 1931 respectively. 
 The Oerlikon to Schwamendingen and Seebach to Glattbrugg lines of the ZOS company, closed in 1931. 
 The Uster to Langholz line of the UOeB company, closed in 1949.
 The Wetzikon to Meilen line of the WMB company, closed in 1950.

In the city, the initial threat to the tram came from its perceived inflexibility and susceptibility to the growing traffic congestion in the city streets. One proposed solution was the conversion of the less busy lines to trolleybus routes, and the first step in this direction was the conversion of tram route 1, from Burgwies to Hardplatz (1954-1956). This was followed by the Farbhof to Schlieren section of route 2 (1956-8) which became a westward extension of the same trolleybus route. In practice, the trolleybus service struggled to cope with peak loadings and punctuality did not improve. No further conversions of tram routes to trolleybuses have taken place.

Underground proposals

In the 1950s, as well as proposing the conversion of less busy lines to trolleybus, plans were also made to place the busier lines in tunnel, in a form called the Tiefbahn. The recently delivered Swiss Standard trams were not seen as suitable for this, because they had doors on their tapered car ends that would not have aligned with the proposed underground station platforms. In order to overcome this limitation, several new designs of tram were introduced. The first design, known as the P16 or Karpfen, could not run on some existing routes, and only one batch of 15 motor tram and trailer pairs was built. A later design, which used articulation to avoid the problems of the P16, was eventually more successful and 126 vehicles were delivered by 1969. This car became popularly known as the Mirage.

Despite the planning and new rolling stock, a referendum in 1962 rejected the Tiefbahn. However the proponents of going underground instead proposed a full scale metro, the Zürich U-Bahn system. This would have been standard gauge and electrified using a third rail, and hence incompatible with the tram system. The lines would have extended further into the suburbs and provided faster transit times than the tramways, which would have been curtailed so as not to compete with the U-Bahn. However this would have been at the expense of a coarser grained network, with much longer distances between U-Bahn stations than between the tram stops they replaced.

In 1973, the U-Bahn proposal too was rejected in a referendum, but not before several stretches of U-Bahn tunnel had been built. One section of the putative U-Bahn has since been adapted, as described below, for use by trams, whilst another now forms the terminus of the Uetliberg and Sihltal railway lines under the Hauptbahnhof.

Extensions and a new model

In 1976, the first tram extension since 1954 took place, with the extension of route 4 from Hardturm to Werdhölzli. Unlike the older lines, this extension was built mostly on reserved track, a precedent to be followed by most subsequent extensions.

The Werdhölzli extension was followed in 1986 by the extension of routes 7 and 9 into new residential areas to the north-east of Zürich. This used one of the stretches of tunnel that had been built for the rejected U-Bahn, between Milchbuck and Schwamendingen. The tram route was extended through the tunnel before splitting at Schwamendingen to serve the area beyond, using new surface track. Because the tunnels and stations had been built with island platforms, whilst Zürich trams only have doors on their nearside, the section through the tunnel uses left-hand running.

From 1976 onwards, the VBZ tram fleet was further updated, with the introduction of Zürich's variant of the Tram 2000 design used by several Swiss tram systems. Several sub-classes of the Tram 2000 were purchased, including articulated and non-articulated variants, and some without drivers cabs that could only operate in multiple with other cars. Eventually 171 of these vehicles were delivered, with the last of the class delivered in 1992.

From the 1980s onwards, the system was increasingly acclaimed for its success in maintaining a high share of the modal split, and the Zürich model of transport provision was named after it. Beyond the tramway, the Zürich S-Bahn rail network was introduced to serve the region beyond the city boundaries, taking on some of the role that was originally planned for the U-Bahn. In 1990, the city's urban and regional transport were integrated by the introduction of the ZVV and its zone-based common fare structure.

Low floors and the Glattalbahn 

In 2001, the VBZ took delivery of the first prototypes of a brand-new low-floor design of tram, known as the Cobra. Despite many teething problems with the prototypes, which were eventually extensively rebuilt, there are now 88 of these trams in service, with the last delivered in 2010. In order to increase the number of low-floor trams in service, 23 trams from the otherwise high-floor Tram 2000 fleet were rebuilt between 2001 and 2005 with the addition of a low-floor centre section.

From the 1950s onwards, the Glattal region to the north of Zürich experienced a rapid boom as population and industry spilled over from nearby Zürich, partly driven by the presence of Zürich Airport. Whilst the airport is served by the city's S-Bahn rail network, the economic growth and resulting congestion led to a need for a finer-grained form of public transport. The responsible transport authority (the Verkehrsbetriebe Glattal or VBG) responded by constructing a new light rail system, the Glattalbahn. This was built to be compatible with Zürich's tram network, with which it connects at several points on the city boundary. The system opened in stages between 2006 and 2010. The VBG contracted the VBZ to operate the network, and several tram routes now operate across both networks.

The arrival of new trams between 2001 and 2010 led to the departure of older vehicles. The Karpfen last ran in regular service in 2006, and the Mirage in 2010. Many members of both classes have been transferred to Vinnytsia in Ukraine.

More extensions and Mirages make a comeback 
Tram Zürich West, an extension from Escher-Wyss-Platz to Bahnhof Altstetten Nord, in the city of Zürich, opened in December 2011. The resulting reorganisation of routes included a new route 17 from Hauptbahnhof to Werdhölzli via Escher-Wyss-Platz, and the diversion of route 4, which had previously served Werdhölzli, to Altstetten. 

In 2017, route 8 was extended from Hardplatz to Hardturm, via a new track over Hardbrücke, the first tram line to cross the main railway line through Zürich (project Tram Hardbrücke). An extension of the tracks from Hardbrücke to Bucheggplatz and Milchbuck (project Rosengartentram und Rosengartentunnel), along with the opening of two new tram routes, was rejected by a referendum in 2020, however. This project would have also included a loop tunnel for the cars between Hardbrücke and Bucheggplatz.

The new route operates over the first section of the so-called Limmatalbahn, not to be confused with the now expired Limmattal tramway, and replaces trolleybus route 31 over that section (line 31 now terminates at Hermetschloo station). The second section of the Limmattalbahn opened in December 2022. The Limmattalbahn is a light rail service (route 20) from Altstetten railway station to Killwangen-Spreitenbach railway station. It is operated by Aargau Verkehr AG (AVA).

The extension of route 2, together with a delay to the delivery of the Bombardier Flexity trams on order (see Future developments), required a reorganisation of other routes in order to free up trams for route 2. In addition two Mirage trams, withdrawn from service nearly ten years earlier but held in reserve, were reinstated to cover some peak workings. The first of the new Flexity trams arrived in Zürich on 13 November 2019, but it is not expected to enter passenger service until the summer of 2020.

The next extension of the urban route network, from Radiostudio to Holzerhurd (called Tram Affoltern), is currently planned and expected to open in 2029. Tram route 11 will operate on this section to Zürich Affoltern and replace the trolleybus route 32 on that section (route 32 will terminate at Bucheggplatz). At the same time, tram route 15 will be extended from Bucheggplatz to Auzelg on the tracks currently used by route 11. Also under discussion is the so-called Tram Nordtangente, a tram line from Zürich Affoltern to Schwamendingen via Oerlikon.

Other extensions (after 2035) are under discussion, including the reenactment of tram route 1 from Hauptbahnhof to Altstetten (served by trolleybus route 31 since the original route 1 was terminated and its tracks removed in the 1950s).

History preserved
The Zürich Tram Museum, located at the former tram depot at Burgwies (on tram route 11), preserves many examples of Zürich's former tramcar fleet, along with other related exhibits.

Operation

Route network

The following tram lines make up the urban routes and the routes of the Glattalbahn and Limmattalbahn networks.
 Portions of routes in italics are on the Glattalbahn (lines 10, 11, 12) or the Limmattalbahn (lines 2, 20) tracks (otherwise VBZ tracks)
 Brackets indicate portions of a route that are only served by that line during peak hour. Deviations from regular routes are possible (e.g. during events such as Street Parade)
 The abbreviation Bhf. (Bahnhof) indicates stops next to railway stations
 Hauptbahnhof (HB) is  Zurich main station, with four nearby tram stops: Bahnhofplatz/HB, Bahnhofquai/HB, Bahnhofstrasse/HB and Sihlquai/HB. Two other stations, Sihlpost/HB and Central, are within walking distance

All journeys on routes 6, 10 and 12 are operated by low-floor trams, whilst at least every other journey on lines 2, 3, 4, 7, 9, 11, 13 and 14 are provided by such vehicles. Most, but not all, tram stops are configured to allow passengers in wheelchairs to board low-floor trams.

Of the three routes that operate in part over Glattalbahn tracks, routes 10 and 12 are operated by the VBZ on behalf of the Verkehrsbetriebe Glattal (VBG), normally using tramcars in the VBG's own predominantly white colour scheme, whilst route 11 is operated by the VBZ on its own behalf, normally using vehicles in its own livery.

In December 2022, the Limmattalbahn opened services between Zürich Altstetten and Killwangen-Spreitenbach (Aargau). It was designated line 20 and is operated by AVA using double-ended (i.e. with two driver's cabs) Stadler Citylink vehicles.

The independent Forchbahn (FB) railway uses VBZ trackwork to reach their city centre terminus, at Bahnhof Stadelhofen, from the eastern edge of the city, at Rehalp. The FB trains operate largely in the street for this section of their route, sharing track with VBZ tram routes, but are categorised as route S18 of the city's S-Bahn railway network rather than as part of the tram network. Beyond Rehalp the trains use the FB's own segregated tracks to reach their outer terminus at Esslingen.

On the last weekend of each month, the Zürich Tram Museum operates tram route 21 (Museumslinie) from the city centre to the museum at Burgwies (up to Rehalp at Saturdays), using their own heritage rolling stock.

Infrastructure

Zürich's tram network is built to metre gauge ( gauge). The tracks are electrified using overhead line at 600 V DC, utilising a supply system shared with the city's trolleybus network.

The VBZ infrastructure within Zürich is largely street based, with varying degrees of segregation from other street traffic and significant sections where trams run in unrestricted traffic lanes. In the city centre the tram tracks run through largely pedestrianised streets, and in one place in the suburbs the trams use a tunnel originally constructed for the never completed Zürich U-Bahn system. By contrast, on VBG infrastructure in the Stadtbahn Glattal, VBZ trams operate on long stretches of dedicated track.

Many of Zürich's tram stops have been equipped with boarding platforms raised to match the floor height of the low floor trams, although there are still examples of stops where passengers must board from street level. Zürich's trams are single-ended, with doors on only one side, although Forchbahn trains are double-ended and double-sided. In consequence all terminal locations are equipped with turning loops, and all tram stops are to the nearside of the tram.

Depots and workshops

Zürich's tram fleet is kept in the five operational depots of Hard, Irchel, Kalkbreite, Oerlikon and  Wollishofen, together with a permanent way yard at Hardturm. Whilst these depots have the capability to undertake minor maintenance, heavier maintenance is the responsibility of the VBZ's central workshop at Altstetten. This is connected to the tram network, and also has a rail connection to the Swiss Federal Railway system, allowing the delivery of infrastructure items and vehicles by rail.

In addition to the above depots and workshops, two other former tram depots, at Burgweis and Wartau, are also still connected to the tram network. Burgweis depot now houses the Tram-Museum Zürich main collection, whilst Wartau is used as a workshop by that organisation. The rail connections permit the occasional operation of preserved trams on the VBZ network.

Tram fleet
As of 2012, the VBZ owns 313 tram vehicles, which between them cover over 16 million vehicle-kilometres per year. All regular public services are covered by 289 vehicles of two basic classes, with the remainder of the fleet made up of a number of assorted works vehicles, including some used for the cargo tram service, and heritage vehicles. The heritage fleet sees occasional use on special services.

The tram fleet comprises the following vehicles:

Fares and tickets

Like the rest of the VBZ network, Zürich's tram network operates on a proof-of-payment system. All tram stops are equipped with ticket machines, and passengers are required to purchase a ticket before boarding the vehicle. Passengers may board through any door and are not required to show tickets on boarding. Instead, tickets are randomly checked by roving teams of fare inspectors, and fines are imposed on passengers found without one.

Tram services are operated within the fare and ticketing system provided by the cantonal public transport authority, the Zürcher Verkehrsverbund (ZVV). This system covers the whole of the canton of Zürich and thus covers travel on other modes and services, provided by many other operators, and includes the Zürich S-Bahn suburban rail network. Free transfer is permitted between different vehicles, routes, modes and operators, provided a ticket valid for the whole journey is held.

The ZVV system is zone-based, with fares for individual journeys set by the zones the journey passes through. The Zürich tram network extends over just two of these zones, with zone 110 covering the city routes, and zone 121 covering the Stadtbahn Glattal routes. Both single journey and day tickets are available, as are a number of passes with longer validities.

Cargo tram

Besides its passenger transport activities, VBZ, jointly with the city refuse and recycling department ERZ, operates the cargo tram to collect bulky waste. The cargo tram serves 10 different collection points around Zürich, calling at each on different days of the month. The collected refuse is taken to a specially constructed siding at the ERZ yard adjacent to the Werdhölzli tram terminus.

The service was introduced in 2003, as an attempt to reduce the amount of bulky waste items dumped illegally every year. As Zürich has an extensive tram network serving most neighbourhoods, and many suitable sidings not used by regular services, it was decided to use the tram network.

The collected waste is carried in two standard refuse containers, which are mounted on four-wheeled flat wagons. These are hauled by car 1922, a former Swiss Standard Tram, originally delivered to Zürich in 1940, and converted into a works car in 1980.

Future developments

New vehicles

The VBZ has long intended to order a new generation of tram cars, to replace the high-floor Tram 2000 trams currently in service. By 2010, it had conducted trials of three existing tram types on its network. These were the Stadler Tango, the Siemens Combino and the Bombardier Flexity. It then requested tenders for the supply of 30 new trams, together with an option for the supply of a further 70 vehicles. The first trams were to be delivered in December 2016, and were to be 100% low floor with capacity for at least 225 passengers. In response, by April 2013 five suppliers had submitted bids. As of February 2015, no decision had been made as to which supplier to select, with reports of conflict between city and canton authorities.

In May 2016, it was announced that VBZ had awarded a contract worth 358 million Swiss Francs to Bombardier Transportation for the supply of 70 7-section Flexity 2 trams, with an option for a further 70, to be delivered between 2018 and 2023. Both Stadler Rail and Siemens filed complaints with the Administrative Court of the Canton of Zürich, causing the finalisation of the contract to be suspended, but the court ruled in February 2017 that VBZ could conclude the contract with Bombardier. After both Stadler and Siemens decided not to appeal this decision to the Federal Supreme Court of Switzerland, the contract was finally signed on 2 March 2017. The first car of the order arrived in Zürich in November 2019, but they are not expected to enter passenger service until the summer of 2020.

System expansion
In the Limmat Valley, between Bahnhof Altstetten and Bahnhof Killwangen-Spreitenbach, the Limmattal light rail line opened in December 2022, after being approved by a referendum held in November 2015. The first section of the line opened in September 2019, and this section connects to the VBZ tram system at Farbhof, the former terminus of route 2. That route has been extended over the light rail line as far as Schlieren, as a partial replacement for trolleybus route 31. The Limmattalbahn, designated route 20, is a regional light rail service between Bahnhof Altstetten and Killwangen-Spreitenbach railway station. It was announced in May 2016 that this service would be operated by BDWM (now Aargau Verkehr AG, AVA).

Currently under planning is the so-called Tram Affoltern, an extension of tracks from Radiostudio to Holzerhurd in Zürich Affoltern. It is expected to open in 2029. Once completed, tram route 11 will be diverted to Holzerhurd from Radiostudio, replacing the trolleybus route 32 on that section (route 32 will terminate at Bucheggplatz). At the same time, tram route 15 will be extended from Bucheggplatz to Auzelg on the tracks currently used by route 11. Also under discussion is the so-called Tram Nordtangente, a tram line from Zürich Affoltern to Schwamendingen via Oerlikon. Other extensions (after 2035) are under discussion, including the reenactment of tram route 1 from Hauptbahnhof to Altstetten (served by trolleybus route 31 since the original route 1 was terminated and its tracks removed in the 1950s).

See also

List of railway companies in Switzerland
List of town tramway systems in Switzerland
Trolleybuses in Zürich

References

Bibliography

External links

VBZ official website
Trams of Zürich unofficial website
Track plan of the Zürich tram system
Tram Museum Zürich website

Tram in Zurich

Public transport in Switzerland
Zurich
Transport in Zürich
1882 establishments in Switzerland
Metre gauge railways in Switzerland
600 V DC railway electrification
Zurich